The women's hammer throw event at the 2006 Commonwealth Games was held on March 20.

Results

References
Results

Hammer
2006
2006 in women's athletics